St. Paul's School, is a Methodist Episcopal school, which was started by New Zealand Baptist Missionary Society in 1943 with a goal of teaching  Tripuri students belonging to the Christian faith and Indigenous community of the interior villages of Tripura, India. The school was the first English medium school in Tripura.

The school was run by the Methodist Episcopalians until 1964.  Then, the general administration of the school was handed over to the Tripura Baptist Christian Union. The school taught in Bengali until 1971, when they switched to English instruction.

References 

 http://www.icbse.com/schools/st-paul-s-school/tr002
http://www.infinitecourses.com/School-Details.aspx?School=St-Pauls-School-Agartala&SchoolID=16743
http://www.educationworld.in/institute/st-pauls-school-agartala.html

External links 
 Facebook 

Christian schools in Tripura
Private schools in Tripura
Education in Agartala
Educational institutions established in 1943
1943 establishments in India